Natalya Bondarenko (born 16 December 1978) is a Belarusian sprint canoeist who competed in the 2000s. She won a bronze medal in the K-2 1000 m event at the 2006 ICF Canoe Sprint World Championships in Szeged.

Bondarenko also finished sixth in the K-4 500 m event at the 2000 Summer Olympics in Sydney.

References

Sports-reference.com profile

1978 births
Belarusian female canoeists
Canoeists at the 2000 Summer Olympics
Living people
Olympic canoeists of Belarus
ICF Canoe Sprint World Championships medalists in kayak
21st-century Belarusian women